Breslov may refer to:

Bratslav, a town in modern Ukraine
Breslov (Hasidic group)
 Breslov Research Institute, a publisher of classic and contemporary Breslov group texts in English

See also
 Breslau (disambiguation)